Shirahige-Tawara Shrine is a Shinto shrine located in Kitsuki City, Oita Prefecture. The it was ranked as a Gosha shrine. Known for its Doburoku festival.

Deities 

 Amatsuhitakahikoho no Mikoto
 Sarutahiko Ōkami
 Amen-Ukemikoto and 51 others.

Doburoku Festival 
The Doburoku Festival has continued for more than 1,300 years since 710 (Wado 3), and is held annually on October 17 and 18.。In recent years, many areas have been designated as Doburoku Special Zones where the production of doburoku is allowed, but the shrine was the only one in Kyushu to be authorized by the National Tax Agency before the special zone for structural reform (special zone) began.

The festival consists of a festival on the day before the festival on October 17 and a grand festival on October 18. Doburoku is served on both days, and on the 18th, a mikoshi parade is held. On the 18th, a mikoshi parade is held. In addition, a "Beard Boast Contest" is held in two categories, one for black hair and the other for beards, named after the shrine.

It was also selected as a Doburoku Festival of Shirahige Shrine by Oita Prefecture on March 23, 1971 as a ''Selected Intangible Folk Cultural Property.

Transportation 

 20 minutes drive from Oita Airport Road Kitsuki IC.
 During the Doburoku Festival, a temporary bus service is available from JR Kyushu Nippō Main Line Kitsuki Station.

References 

Shinto shrines in Ōita Prefecture
Pages with unreviewed translations